WWMC (92.9 FM, Gospel 1010 & 92.9) is a radio station broadcasting an Urban Gospel format. Licensed to Kinston, North Carolina, United States, the station is currently owned by Donald W. Curtis, through licensee Eastern Airwaves, LLC.

History
WELS AM 1010 went off the air on November 7, 2012. The new station is on WWMC-AM Gospel 1010 And Now the new Power 250 Watts FM
on 92.9 W225CD. The Gospel station WELS-AM became WWMC in 2015.

References

External links

WMC
Gospel radio stations in the United States